Geranylfarnesyl diphosphate synthase (FGPP synthase, (all-E) geranylfarnesyl diphosphate synthase, GFPS, Fgs) is an enzyme with systematic name geranylgeranyl-diphosphate:isopentenyl-diphosphate transtransferase (adding 1 isopentenyl unit). This enzyme catalyses the following chemical reaction

 geranylgeranyl diphosphate + isopentenyl diphosphate  (2E,6E,10E,14E)-geranylfarnesyl diphosphate + diphosphate

The enzyme from Methanosarcina mazei is involved in biosynthesis of the polyprenyl side-chain of methanophenazine.

References

External links 

EC 2.5.1